In algebraic geometry, a Castelnuovo curve, studied by , is a curve in projective space Pn of maximal genus g among irreducible non-degenerate curves of given degree d.

Castelnuovo showed that the maximal genus is given by the Castelnuovo bound

where m and ε are the quotient and remainder when dividing d–1 by n–1.
Castelnuovo described the curves satisfying this bound, showing in particular that they lie on either a rational normal scroll or on the Veronese surface.

References

Algebraic curves